The Market Misconduct Tribunal is an independent body in Hong Kong which is established under the Securities and Futures Ordinance (Cap. 571) (SFO), and is chaired by a judge or former judge of the High Court who sits with two members.

Background
The Market Misconduct Tribunal (MMT) was established in 2003 under the provisions contained in the SFO. In accordance with the SFO, if it appears to the Securities and Futures Commission (SFC) that market misconduct or a breach of a disclosure requirement under Part XIVA of the SFO has or may have taken place, the SFC may institute proceedings before the MMT. The MMT has jurisdiction to hear and determine any question or issue arising out of or in connection with the proceedings instituted under the SFO.

Market misconduct includes insider dealing, false trading, price rigging, stock market manipulation, disclosure of information about prohibited transactions and disclosure of false or misleading information inducing transactions in securities and futures contracts. Such conduct is detrimental to the interests of investors and damages the reputation of Hong Kong as an international financial centre. In accordance with the SFO, if it appears to the SFC that market misconduct or a breach of a disclosure requirement under Part XIVA of the SFO has or may have taken place, the SFC may institute proceedings before the MMT. The MMT conducts civil proceedings and, where appropriate, imposes civil sanctions against those it determines to be wrongdoers. It helps promote market confidence by protecting the interests of the investing public and reducing market malpractice.

Chairmen
The Chairman of the MMT is appointed by the Chief Executive on the recommendation of the Chief Justice. In its proceedings, the Chairman sits with two members who are prominent members of Hong Kong's business and professional community appointed by the Financial Secretary under the authority delegated by the Chief Executive. Every sitting of the MMT must be held in public unless the MMT considers, in the interests of justice, that a sitting (or any part of it) should be held in private. The following judges are currently appointed as Chairmen of the MMT:
 Mr. Michael John HARTMANN, G.B.S.
 Mr. Kenneth KWOK Hing-wai, S.B.S., S.C., J.P.
 Mr. Michael Victor LUNN, G.B.S.
 Mr. Ian Charles McWALTERS, G.B.S., J.P.

Notable cases
 AcrossAsia Limited
 Asia Telemedia Limited
 CITIC Pacific Limited
 China Gas Holdings Limited
 Evergrande Real Estate Group Limited and Andrew Left
 Water Oasis Group Limited

References

Financial law
Securities (finance)
2000s establishments in Hong Kong
Financial regulatory authorities of Hong Kong
Statutory bodies in Hong Kong